Fisher River may refer to:

In Australia:
Fisher River (Tasmania), a river near the Fisher Power Station

In Canada:
Fisher River Cree Nation
Fisher River (Manitoba), a river that flows into Lake Winnipeg near Fisher Bay Provincial Park

In the United States:
Fisher River (Montana)
Fisher River (North Carolina)
Fisher River (Wisconsin), a river that joins the Chippewa River in Brunet Island State Park

See also 
 Fish River (disambiguation)
 Fishing Creek (disambiguation)